Grassy Precinct, formerly township, is Congressional Township 10 South, Range 1 East of the Third Principal Meridian located in Williamson County, Illinois. It is named for Grassy Creek, which has since been used to create Little Grassy Lake.

References

Townships in Williamson County, Illinois
Precincts in Illinois